Gerry Worsell (born 1 May 1930) is a British water polo player. He competed at the 1952 Summer Olympics and the 1956 Summer Olympics.

References

1930 births
Living people
British male water polo players
Olympic water polo players of Great Britain
Water polo players at the 1952 Summer Olympics
Water polo players at the 1956 Summer Olympics
People from Lambeth